33rd NSFC Awards
January 3, 1999

Best Film: 
 Out of Sight 
The 33rd National Society of Film Critics Awards, given on 3 January 1999, honored the best filmmaking of 1998.

Winners

Best Picture 
1. Out of Sight
2. Affliction
3. Saving Private Ryan

Best Director 
1. Steven Soderbergh – Out of Sight
2. Terrence Malick – The Thin Red Line
2. Steven Spielberg – Saving Private Ryan

Best Actor 
1. Nick Nolte – Affliction
2. Ian McKellen – Gods and Monsters
3. Brendan Gleeson – The General and I Went Down

Best Actress 
1. Ally Sheedy – High Art
2. Cate Blanchett – Elizabeth
3. Fernanda Montenegro – Central Station (Central do Brasil)

Best Supporting Actor 
1. Bill Murray – Rushmore
2. Donald Sutherland – Without Limits
3. Billy Bob Thornton – A Simple Plan

Best Supporting Actress 
1. Judi Dench – Shakespeare in Love
2. Patricia Clarkson – High Art
3. Lisa Kudrow – The Opposite of Sex

Best Screenplay 
1. Scott Frank – Out of Sight
2. Marc Norman and Tom Stoppard – Shakespeare in Love
3. Wes Anderson and Owen Wilson – Rushmore

Best Cinematography 
1. John Toll – The Thin Red Line
2. Janusz Kamiński – Saving Private Ryan
3. Seamus Deasy – The General

Best Foreign Language Film 
1. Taste of Cherry (Ta'm e guilass)
2. Fireworks (Hana-bi)
3. The Celebration (Festen)

Best Non-Fiction Film 
1. The Farm: Angola, USA
2. Public Housing
3. Little Dieter Needs to Fly

Experimental Film 
Mother and Son (Mat i syn)

Special Citation 
Walter Murch, Rick Schmidlin, Bob O'Neil and Jonathan Rosenbaum for the re-editing of Orson Welles's Touch of Evil
Reprinting of an expanded edition of one of the seminal collections of film criticism, Manny Farber's Negative Space

References

External links
Past Awards

1998 film awards
1998
1999 in American cinema